Diadegma mandschukuonum is a wasp first described by Uchida in 1942. It is a member of the genus Diadegma and family Ichneumonidae. No subspecies are listed.

References 

mandschukuonum

Insects described in 1942